Salisbury Highway (and its northern section as John Rice Avenue) is a 15 kilometre major connecting road in the northern suburbs of the Adelaide metropolitan area. It is designated part of route A9.

Route
Salisbury Highway starts at the interchange with the North-South Motorway in Wingfield and heads east as a four-lane, dual-carriageway road and then north-east through the north-eastern suburbs of Adelaide, runs parallel to Main North Road from Mawson Lakes through Salisbury where it intersects with Commercial Road, changing name to John Rice Avenue and narrowing to a four-lane, single-carriageway road. It continues a short distance east to terminate with Main North Road in Elizabeth Vale.

History
Until the early 1990s, Salisbury Highway terminated at Port Wakefield Road. The Salisbury Highway Extension project built the bridge and interchange at Port Wakefield Road, and extended the highway to Wingfield, where it joined the north end of what was then the South Road Interconnector. Neither the Port River Expressway nor the North–South Motorway had been built at that time.

Salisbury Highway (and John Rice Avenue) was originally designated as part of route A13 when South Australia switched to the alpha-numeric road route system in 1998 (with Salisbury Highway between Port River Expressway and Port Wakefield Road was shown as part of National Highway A13 on local road signage and major street directory publications); it was replaced by route A9 in 2017.

Major intersections

Gallery

See also

 Highways in Australia
 List of highways in South Australia

References

Roads in Adelaide
Freeways and highways in Adelaide